Una Lágrima No Basta (Eng.: A Tear Is Not Enough) is a studio album released by the romantic music band Los Temerarios. This album became their third number-one album in the  Billboard Top Latin Albums chart. Only 3 original members are left, Carlos Abrego departs in 2001, and Jonathan Amabilis takes the spot as guitarist and percussionist.

Track listing
All tracks written by Adolfo Ángel Alba
Por Qué Será —  3:54
Comer a Besos — 3:47
Déjame Soñar — 4:45
Sé Que Te Amo — 4:06
Te Regalo Mi Tristeza — 3:38
Una Lágrima No Basta — 4:15
Que Tu Vida Es — 3:58
Olvidar Así — 3:59
Gitana Baila — 4:14
No Sé Vivir Sin Tí — 3:43
Una Lágrima No Basta (Salsa version) — 3:49
Una Lágrima No Basta (Ballad version) — 3:55
Una Lágrima No Basta (Dance version) — 5:02
Una Lágrima No Basta (Remix-Radio version) — 3:31

Personnel
This information from Allmusic.
Mayra Angelica Alba — Production coordination
Oscar Benavides — Direction
Maggie Vera — Direction
Santiago Yturria — Direction
Horacio Marano — Programming, mixing, vocals
Gabriel Martínez — Engineer, mixing engineer
Carlos Ceballos — Recording
Bernie Grundman — Mastering
Rene Barquet — Engineer, mixing
Carlos Cabral Jr. — Guitar
Ramon Estagnado — Guitar
Robert Flores — Bass guitar
Norma Hernández — Vocals
Richard Mochulske — Art Direction, mixing
Adolfo Pérez Butrón — Photography
Eduardo Arias — Make-Up

Chart performance

Certifications

References

2002 albums
Los Temerarios albums
 Fonovisa Records albums